Wakimoto (written: 脇本) is a Japanese surname. Notable people with the surname include:

Kosei Wakimoto (born 1994), Japanese footballer
Roger Wakimoto (born 1953), American atmospheric scientist
, Japanese cyclist

Japanese-language surnames